Thomas Sparks may refer to

 Thomas Sparks, a sailing ship chartered by the New Zealand Company in 1842
 Tommy Sparks, a Swedish-born English singer-songwriter from London
 Tommy Sparks (album), a debut album for Tommy Sparks
 Tully Sparks, a former professional baseball player who played pitcher in the Major Leagues from 1897 to 1910